In cooking, a sauce is a liquid, cream, or semi-solid food, served on or used in preparing other foods. Most sauces are not normally consumed by themselves; they add flavor, moisture, and visual appeal to a dish. Sauce is a French word taken from the Latin salsa, meaning salted. Possibly the oldest recorded European sauce is garum, the fish sauce used by the Ancient Romans, while doubanjiang, the Chinese soy bean paste is mentioned in Rites of Zhou in the 3rd century BC.

Sauces need a liquid component. Sauces are an essential element in cuisines all over the world.

Sauces may be used for sweet or savory dishes. They may be prepared and served cold, like mayonnaise, prepared cold but served lukewarm like pesto, cooked and served warm like bechamel or cooked and served cold like apple sauce. They may be freshly prepared by the cook, especially in restaurants, but today many sauces are sold premade and packaged like Worcestershire sauce, HP Sauce, soy sauce or ketchup. Sauces for salad are called salad dressing. Sauces made by deglazing a pan are called pan sauces. 

A chef who specializes in making sauces is called a saucier.

Cuisines

British
In traditional British cuisine, gravy is a sauce used on roast dinner. The sole survivor of the medieval bread-thickened sauces, bread sauce is one of the oldest sauces in British cooking. Apple sauce, mint sauce and horseradish sauce are used on meat (usually on pork, lamb and beef respectively). Redcurrant jelly, mint jelly, and white sauce may also be used. Salad cream is sometimes used on salads. Ketchup and brown sauce are used on fast-food type dishes. Strong English mustard is also used on various foods, as is Worcestershire sauce. Custard is a popular dessert sauce. Other popular sauces include mushroom sauce, marie rose sauce (as used in a prawn cocktail), whisky sauce (for serving with haggis), Albert sauce (horseradish sauce to enhance flavour of braised beef) and cheddar sauce (as used in cauliflower or macaroni and cheese). In contemporary British cuisine, owing to the wide diversity of British society today, there are also many sauces that are of British origin but based upon the cuisine of other countries, particularly former colonies such as India.

Caucasian 
 Ajika is a spicy hot sauce originating in Abkhazia, widely used in Georgian cuisine and found also in parts of Russia, Armenia, and Georgia.
 Ships (sauce) is a traditional sauce of Circassian cuisine, made on a base of meat broth with pounded garlic, pepper, and sour milk or cream.
 Tkemali is a tart and savoury traditional Georgian sauce of cherry plums in combination with various spices, including garlic, pennyroyal, coriander, dill, and chili.

Chinese 
There are many varied cuisines in China, but many of them compose dishes from sauces including different kinds of soy sauce, fermented bean paste including doubanjiang, chili sauces, oyster sauce, and also many oils and vinegar preparations. These ingredients are used to build up a range of different sauces and condiments used before, during, or after cooking the main ingredients for a dish:

 Braising sauces or marinades (卤水)
 Cooking sauces (调味)
 Dipping sauces (蘸水)

In some Chinese cuisines, such as Cantonese, dishes are often thickened with a slurry of cornstarch or potato starch and water.

See List of Chinese sauces

Filipino 
Filipino cuisine typically uses "toyomansi" (soy sauce with kalamansi lime) as well as different varieties of suka, patis, bagoong and banana ketchup, among others.

French

Sauces in French cuisine date back to the Middle Ages. There were many hundreds of sauces in the culinary repertoire. In cuisine classique (roughly from the end of the 19th century until the advent of nouvelle cuisine in the 1980s), sauces were a major defining characteristic of French cuisine.

In the early 19th century, the chef Marie-Antoine Carême created an extensive list of sauces, many of which were original recipes. It is unknown how many sauces Carême is responsible for, but it is estimated to be in the hundreds. Most of them have been listed in Carême reference cookbook "The art of French Cuisine in the 19th century" (The French Title: "L'art de la cuisine française au XIXe siècle").

Carême considered the four grandes sauces to be Espagnole, Velouté, Allemande, and Béchamel, from which a large variety of petites sauces could be composed.

In the early 20th century, the chef Auguste Escoffier refined Carême's list of basic sauces in his classic Le Guide culinaire, which in the most recent 4th edition that was published in 1921, listed the foundation or basic sauces as Espagnole, Velouté, Béchamel, and Tomate.  Sauce Allemande, which was mentioned as a preparation of Velouté made with egg yolks, is replaced by Sauce Tomate. One other sauce-de-base that is mentioned in Le Guide culinaire is Sauce Mayonnaise, which Escoffier wrote was a sauce Mère akin to the sauces Espagnole and Velouté due to the number of derivative sauces that can be made.

In A Guide to Modern Cookery, an English abridged translation of Escoffier's 1903 edition of Le Guide culinaire, Hollandaise was included in the list of basic sauces, which made for a list that is identical to the list of five fundamental "French Mother Sauces" that is acknowledged by a variety of sources:

 Sauce Espagnole, a fortified brown veal stock sauce, thickened with a brown roux
 Sauce Velouté, a light stock-based sauce, thickened with a roux or a liaison, a mixture of egg yolks and cream.
 Sauce Béchamel, a milk-based sauce, thickened with a roux of flour and butter.
 Sauce Tomate, a tomato-based sauce.
 Sauce Hollandaise, an emulsion of butter and lemon (or vinegar), using egg yolk as the emulsifier.

A sauce which is derived from one of the mother sauces by augmenting with additional ingredients is sometimes called a "daughter sauce" or "secondary sauce". Most sauces commonly used in classical cuisine are daughter sauces. For example, béchamel can be made into Mornay by the addition of grated cheese, and espagnole becomes bordelaise with the addition of reduction of red wine, shallots, and poached beef marrow.

A specialized implement, the French sauce spoon, was introduced in the mid-20th century to aid in eating sauce in French cuisine, is enjoying increasing popularity at high-end restaurants.

Indian 
Indian cuisines use sauces such as tomato-based sauces with varying spice combinations such as tamarind sauce, coconut milk-/paste-based sauces, and chutneys. There are substantial regional variations in Indian cuisine, but many sauces use a seasoned mix of onion, ginger and garlic paste as the base of various gravies and sauces. Various cooking oils, ghee and/or cream are also regular ingredients in Indian sauces.

Indonesian 
Indonesian cuisine uses typical sauces such as kecap manis (sweet soy sauce), bumbu kacang (peanut sauce) and tauco, while popular hot and spicy sauces are sambal, colo-colo, dabu-dabu and rica-rica. Sambal is an umbrella term; there are many, many kinds of sambal.

Italian
Italian sauces reflect the rich variety of the Italian cuisine and can be divided in several categories including:

Savory

For meats, fish and vegetables
Examples are:
 Besciamella from Tuscany and Emilia-Romagna
 Bagna càuda from Piedmont
 Salmoriglio from Sicily
 Gremolata from Milan
 Salsa verde from Emilia-Romagna and Tuscany

For pasta

There are thousands of such sauces, and many towns have traditional sauces. Among the internationally well-known are:
 Ragù alla Bolognese from Bologna
 Pesto from Genoa
 Carbonara and amatriciana from Lazio
Ragù alla Napoletana from Campania

Dessert
 Zabaione from Piedmont
 Crema pasticciera made with eggs and milk and common in the whole peninsula
 "Crema al mascarpone" used to make Tiramisù and to dress panettone at Christmas and common in the North of the country.

Japanese
Sauces used in traditional Japanese cuisine are usually based on shōyu (soy sauce), miso or dashi. Ponzu, citrus-flavored soy sauce, and yakitori no tare, sweetened rich soy sauce, are examples of shōyu-based sauces. Miso-based sauces include gomamiso, miso with ground sesame, and amamiso, sweetened miso. In modern Japanese cuisine, the word "sauce" often refers to Worcestershire sauce, introduced in the 19th century and modified to suit Japanese tastes. Tonkatsu, okonomiyaki, and yakisoba sauces are based on this sauce. Japanese sauce or wasabi sauce is used on sushi and sashimi or mixed with soy sauce to make wasabi-joyu.

Korean 
Korean cuisine uses sauces such as doenjang, gochujang, samjang, aekjeot, and soy sauce.

Latin and Spanish American
Salsas ("sauces" in Spanish) such as pico de gallo (tomato, onion and chili chopped with lemon juice), salsa cocida, salsa verde, chile, and salsa roja are an important part of many Latin and Spanish-American cuisines in the Americas. Typical ingredients include chili, tomato, onion, and spices; thicker sauces often contain avocado.

Mexican cuisine includes sauces which may contain chocolate, seeds, and chiles collectively known by the Nahua name mole (compare guacamole).

In Argentinian and Uruguayan cuisine, chimichurri is an uncooked sauce used in cooking and as a table condiment for grilled meat.

Peruvian cuisine uses sauces based mostly in different varieties of ají combined with several ingredients, most notably salsa huancaína based on fresh cheese and salsa de ocopa based on peanuts or nuts.

Middle Eastern
 Fesenjān is a traditional Iranian sauce of pomegranates and walnuts served over meat and/or vegetables which was traditionally served for Yalda or end of winter and the Nowruz ceremony.
 Hummus is a traditional middle eastern sauce or dip. It originated in Egypt, but is considered as a traditional food of many Arab countries such as Syria and Palestine. It's made of chickpeas and tahina (sesame paste) and garlic with olive oil, salt and lemon juice.

Thai 
 Southeast Asian cuisines, such as Thai and Vietnamese cuisine, often use fish sauce, made from fermented fish.

Examples

See also

 Pickle
 Chutney
 Condiment
 Coulis
 Dip
 List of dips
 Gastrique
 Gravy
 Instant sauce
 List of foods
 List of condiments
 List of dessert sauces
 List of sauces
 Peanut sauce
 Salad dressing
 Salsa
 Sambal
 Saucery
 Sofrito

References

Footnotes

Citations

Further reading
 
 Murdoch (2004) Essential Seafood Cookbook Seafood sauces, p. 128–143. Murdoch Books.

External links

 "Sauce" entry at Encyclopædia Britannica

 
Culinary terminology